San Lorenzo District is a district (distrito) of Chiriquí Province in Panama. The population according to the 2000 census was 6,498. The district covers a total area of 738 km². The capital lies at the city of Horconcitos.

Administrative divisions
San Lorenzo District is divided administratively into the following corregimientos:

Horconcitos (capital)
Boca Chica
Boca del Monte
San Juan
San Lorenzo

References

Districts of Panama
Chiriquí Province